Wannaminta Station is a cattle station located at  in far western New South Wales.
The area includes Bullea Lake and Green Lake and the Silver City Highway.

References

Stations (Australian agriculture)
Pastoral leases in New South Wales
Localities in New South Wales
Far West (New South Wales)